Kaili Sirge (born 23 July 1983) is an Estonian cross-country skier. She competed in five events at the 2006 Winter Olympics.

Cross-country skiing results
All results are sourced from the International Ski Federation (FIS).

Olympic Games

World Championships

World Cup

References

External links
 

1983 births
Living people
People from Tapa Parish
Estonian female cross-country skiers
Olympic cross-country skiers of Estonia
Cross-country skiers at the 2006 Winter Olympics
Universiade bronze medalists for Estonia
Universiade medalists in cross-country skiing
Cross-country skiers at the 2007 Winter Universiade
Medalists at the 2007 Winter Universiade